Fanny Laure Appes Ekanga (born 9 June 1989) is a Cameroonian sprinter. She represented her country at the 2010 and 2018 Commonwealth Games.

International competitions

1Did not start in the semifinals

Personal bests
Outdoor
100 metres – 11.39 (-1.1 m/s, Ghent 2014)
200 metres – 23.73 (+1.3 m/s, Brussels 2014)
400 metres – 56.84 (Oordegem 2017)

Indoor
60 metres – 7.45 (Ghent  2014)

References

1989 births
Living people
Cameroonian female sprinters
Athletes (track and field) at the 2010 Commonwealth Games
Athletes (track and field) at the 2018 Commonwealth Games
Athletes (track and field) at the 2019 African Games
Commonwealth Games competitors for Cameroon
Competitors at the 2011 Summer Universiade
Competitors at the 2013 Summer Universiade
African Games competitors for Cameroon
20th-century Cameroonian women
21st-century Cameroonian women